An orthotist is a healthcare professional who specializes in the provision of orthoses. An orthotist has an overall responsibly of orthotics treatment, who can supervise and mentor the practice of other personnel. They are clinicians trained to assess the needs of the user, prescribe treatment, determine the precise technical specifications of orthotic devices, take measurements and image of body segments, prepare model of the evaluation, fit devices and evaluate treatment outcome. In the United States, orthotists work by prescription from a licensed healthcare provider. Physical therapists are not legally authorized to prescribe orthoses in the U.S. In the U.K., orthotists will often accept open referrals for orthotic assessment without a specific prescription from doctors or other healthcare professionals.

Scope 
The scope of an orthotist includes the design and application of orthoses (braces or orthotic devices). The definition of an orthosis is an “externally applied device used to modify the structural and functional characteristics of the neuromuscular and skeletal system”.

Training

Canada

In Canada, a Certified Orthotist CO(c) provides clinical assessment, treatment plan development, patient management, technical design, and fabrication of custom orthoses to maximize patient outcomes. To become CBCPO certified through Orthotics Prosthetics Canada (OPC) an applicant must successfully meet the following requirements:

 be fluent in French or English;
 be a Canadian citizen or legal landed immigrant;
 graduate from an OPC approved post-secondary clinical Prosthetic and Orthotic program;
 complete a minimum 3450 hours of Residency in Orthotics under the direct supervision of a Canadian certified orthotist;
 successfully challenge the written, oral and practical national certification exams.

Upon successful completion of the national certification exams, candidates are conferred the designation of Canadian Certified Orthotist CO(c).

United Kingdom

In the UK orthotists assess patients, and where appropriate design and fit orthoses for any part of the body. Registration is with the Health and Care Professions Council and BAPO - the British Association of Prosthetists and Orthotists. The training is a B.Sc.(Hons) in Prosthetics and Orthotics at either the University of Salford or University of Strathclyde. New graduates are therefore eligible to work as an orthotist and/or prosthetist.

Podiatrists are the other profession involved with foot orthotic provision. They are also registered with the Health and Care Professions Council . Podiatrists assess gait to provide orthotics to improve foot function and alignment or may use orthoses to redistribute stress on pressure areas for those with diabetes or rheumatoid arthritis.

United States

A licensed orthotist is an orthotist who is recognized by the particular state in which they are licensed to have met basic standards of proficiency, as determined by examination and experience to adequately and safely contribute to the health of the residents of that state. An American Board of Certification certified orthotist has met certain standards; these include a degree in orthotics, completion of a one-year residency at an approved clinical site, and passing a rigorous three-part exam. A certified orthotist (CO) is an orthotist who has passed the certification standards of the American Board of Certification in Orthotics, Prosthetics and Pedorthics. Other credentialing bodies who are involved in orthotics include the Board for Orthotic Certification, the pharmaceutical industry, the Pedorthic Footcare Association, and various of the professional associations who work with athletic trainers, physical and occupational therapists, and orthopedic technologists/cast technicians.

Iran
Four universities including the Iran University of Medical Science, Isfahan University of Medical Science, University of Social Welfare and Rehabilitation Sciences and Iran Red Crescent University confer bachelor of science in the Prosthetics and Orthotics. Three universities including Isfahan University of Medical Science, the Iran University of Medical Science and University of Social Welfare and Rehabilitation Science also confer M.Sc. and Ph.D. New bachelor graduates are eligible to work as an orthotist and prosthetist after registration in the Medical Council of Iran.

See also 
Orthotics

Prosthetist

References 

Orthopedics